Jamath Shoffner (born 10 July 1978) is an American former soccer player who is last known to have played as a defender or midfielder for Käerjéng.

Career

In 2002, Shoffner signed for German third division side Borussia Neunkirchen from Carolina Dynamo in the American third division.

In 2003, he signed for American second division club Virginia Beach Mariners before joining SV Weil in the German fifth division.

In 2009, Shoffner signed for Luxembourgish team Käerjéng, where he became the first American to play professionally in the country.

References

External links
 Jamath Shoffner at soccerstats.us
 
 

American soccer players
Living people
Expatriate footballers in Luxembourg
USL First Division players
USL Second Division players
North Carolina Fusion U23 players
Virginia Beach Mariners players
Association football defenders
1978 births
Regionalliga players
American expatriate sportspeople in Luxembourg
American expatriate soccer players in Germany
Association football midfielders
Luxembourg National Division players
UN Käerjéng 97 players
Borussia Neunkirchen players
American expatriate soccer players
Charlotte 49ers men's soccer players
American soccer coaches
Soccer players from North Carolina
Sportspeople from Greensboro, North Carolina
Charlotte FC non-playing staff